Adia Oshun Barnes (born February 3, 1977) is an American basketball coach and former player. She is currently the head coach of the University of Arizona Wildcats women's basketball. She played at the collegiate level for the University of Arizona, and played seven seasons in the Women's National Basketball Association (WNBA) with the Houston Comets, Seattle Storm, Minnesota Lynx, and Sacramento Monarchs. She has played internationally with Dynamo Kiev in Ukraine. Barnes has also served as a TV color analyst for Seattle Storm game broadcasts.

Early years
Barnes grew up in San Diego, California and attended Mission Bay Senior High School in San Diego. She is the daughter of NFL player Pete Barnes. He and Adia's mother divorced when she was three. Over the course of her high school career, she amassed 1112 blocks, the most ever recorded by a female high school basketball player, 253 blocks ahead of second place Chris Enger.

College
At 5'11", Barnes wasn't as tall as most post position players at the highly regarded Division I schools. The University of Arizona head coach Joan Bonvicini initially didn't think she would be able to play at the post, even after watching film of her play. However, after seeing her in person, she immediately offered Barnes a scholarship, who enrolled in the school for the 1995 season. Her physical play earned her a comparison to Charles Barkley from a Sports Illustrated writer. In her freshman year she earned the Pac-10 freshman of the year award, the first player from Arizona to win such an award.

In Barnes's sophomore year, the team  earned a WNIT bid and won the championship. Barnes was named the tournament Most Valuable Player. As a junior, Barnes helped the team to their first ever NCAA appearance. They won their first game against Western Kentucky, and then lost by six points to the second seed in their bracket, Georgia. She went on to set 22 individual records for the Arizona Wildcats, including career points and rebounds, many of which are still records. She would go on to become the first women's player in Arizona to be drafted into the professional leagues.

WNBA career
Although successful as an undersized post in college, Barnes knew that she would not be able to continue as a post player in the pros, so she decided to transform herself into a guard. She originally was signed by the now-defunct Sacramento Monarchs, playing in 29 games and earning a starting position in 16 games. However, she was then traded to Minnesota and then Cleveland, and saw her playing time dwindle. She played overseas to work on her skills and concentrated on becoming a specialist. In 2002, she was traded to the Seattle Storm, who were picked to finish second to last in their division. With Sue Bird and Lauren Jackson on the team, Storm coach Lin Dunn wasn't looking for a scorer, so Barnes concentrated on becoming a shut-down defender. Her work effort paid off, and she helped the team to make the playoffs in only their third year of existence.

International
Barnes also played internationally with Dynamo Kiev in Ukraine. She played for several Euroleague teams, Priolo (Italy), Elitzur Ramla (Israel), Napoli BK (Italy), UMMC (Russia), Mersin (Turkey), and Pozzuoli (Italy).

Broadcasting
In 2007, Barnes became a color commentator for the radio coverage of the Storm. She had some experience as a commentator for the World Championship games. The games were held in Brazil, but the broadcasts were done in a remote studio, making it a challenge. As of 2012, she did broadcasts of Storm games for both radio and TV, along with play-by-play announcer Dick Fain. Barnes was also the color commentator for the radio broadcasts of Seattle University Redhawks women's basketball games during the 2010–2011 season.

Coaching
In October 2010, Barnes was named Director of Player and Coach Development at Seattle Academy.

Barnes was approached by her Arizona coach Joan Bonvicini to see if she was interested in coaching. At the time, Barnes was still actively playing for the Storm, and turned down the opportunity. However, she enjoyed working at camps, so when the new head coach of the University of Washington, Kevin McGuff, asked her in 2011 to consider coaching, he was able to persuade her, and she joined the Huskies as an assistant coach. Barnes was named head women's basketball coach at the University of Arizona on April 4, 2016.

After a fairly rough start to her coaching career, Barnes entered her third season with the Wildcats, with high hopes. The team began the year 12–1, but ultimately struggled when it came to Pac-12 conference play. After finishing the regular season with 17 wins, their most in the regular season since 2010–11, Arizona entered the conference tournament as the No. 8 seed, knocking off USC to begin tournament play. The Wildcats would finish the year 18–13, before ultimately being selected for the Women's National Invitation Tournament.

The Wildcats guided by Barnes, would make it to the WNIT Final, knocking off Northwestern to become the 2019 WNIT Champions.

The Wildcats beat Indiana in 2021 to reach the school's first ever Final Four.

On April 2, 2021, the Wildcats beat the University of Connecticut Huskies to reach the school's first NCAA tournament championship game.

University of Arizona statistics
Source

WNBA career statistics

Regular season

|-
| align="left" | 1998
| align="left" | Sacramento
| 29 || 16 || 21.3 || .395 || .298 || .744 || 2.9 || 0.8 || 0.5 || 0.3 || 1.9 || 7.6
|-
| align="left" | 1999
| align="left" | Minnesota
| 19 || 0 || 4.8 || .304 || .333 || .500 || 1.1 || 0.3 || 0.3 || 0.0 || 0.4 || 1.1
|-
| align="left" | 2000
| align="left" | Cleveland
| 5 || 0 || 3.6 || .600 || .000 || .500 || 0.4 || 0.8 || 0.0 || 0.0 || 0.4 || 1.6
|-
| align="left" | 2001
| align="left" | Cleveland
| 3 || 0 || 1.0 || 1.000 || .000 || .000 || 0.3 || 0.0 || 0.0 || 0.0 || 0.0 || 0.7
|-
| align="left" | 2002
| align="left" | Seattle
| 26 || 17 || 19.0 || .333 || .250 || .517 || 3.9 || 1.1 || 1.2 || 0.3 || 1.0 || 3.5
|-
| align="left" | 2003
| align="left" | Seattle
| 16 || 16 || 24.8 || .381 || .387 || .571 || 4.1 || 1.4 || 0.7 || 0.4 || 1.1 || 5.5
|-
|style="text-align:left;background:#afe6ba;"| 2004†
| align="left" | Seattle
| 34 || 2 || 11.8 || .304 || .500 || .710 || 1.9 || 0.0 || 0.7 || 0.1 || 0.7 || 2.0
|-
| align="left" | Career
| align="left" | 7 years, 4 teams
| 132 || 51 || 15.3 || .366 || .337 || .632 || 2.6 || 0.9 || 0.7 || 0.2 || 1.0 || 3.8

Playoffs

|-
| align="left" | 2000
| align="left" | Cleveland
| 4 || 0 || 1.5 || .500 || .000 || .000 || 0.3 || 0.5 || 0.0 || 0.0 || 0.3 || 0.5
|-
| align="left" | 2002
| align="left" | Seattle
| 2 || 2 || 25.0 || .444 || .500 || .000 || 4.0 || 1.5 || 1.5 || 0.0 || 3.5 || 5.0
|-
|style="text-align:left;background:#afe6ba;"| 2004†
| align="left" | Seattle
| 6 || 0 || 6.5 || .273 || .000 || .250 || 1.3 || 0.8 || 0.5 || 0.2 || 0.2 || 1.2
|-
| align="left" | Career
| align="left" | 3 years, 2 teams
| 12 || 2 || 7.9 || .364 || .400 || .250 || 1.4 || 0.8 || 0.5 || 0.1 || 0.8 || 1.6

Head coaching record

Awards and achievements
 1995—Pac-10 Conference Freshman of the Year
 1996—WNIT Most Valuable Player
 1998—Pac-10 Conference Player of the Year
 1998—AP All-American (third team)
 1998—U.S. Basketball Writers Association All-American (first team)
 University of Arizona—Points scored career 2237
 University of Arizona—Points scored single season 653
 University of Arizona—Points scored single game 35
 University of Arizona—Rebounds career 921
 2003—Inducted into the University of Arizona Hall of Fame

Personal life
Barnes on July 4, 2012, married Salvo Coppa, a basketball coach she met in Italy. They have two children.

References

External links
 
 
 Eurobasket profile
 Adia Barnes Foundation

1977 births
Living people
20th-century African-American women
20th-century African-American people
20th-century African-American sportspeople
21st-century African-American women
21st-century African-American sportspeople
African-American basketball players
African-American sportswomen
All-American college women's basketball players
American expatriate basketball people in Portugal
American expatriate basketball people in Ukraine
American women's basketball coaches
American women's basketball players
Arizona Wildcats women's basketball coaches
Arizona Wildcats women's basketball players
Basketball coaches from California
Basketball players from San Diego
Cleveland Rockers players
Houston Comets players
Minnesota Lynx players
Sacramento Monarchs players
Seattle Storm players
Small forwards
Washington Huskies women's basketball coaches